Fox is a brand of television channels owned by Fox Networks Group, a subsidiary of the Disney Entertainment division of The Walt Disney Company. The brand was included with  Disney's acquisition of 21st Century Fox in 2019. It shares its name with the Fox Broadcasting Company, a now unaffiliated American television network owned by the Fox Corporation, which was spun off from 21st Century Fox before the sale. Except for the channel in Turkey, which focuses on original programming, the international Fox channels generally focus on syndicated programming.

As part of an agreement with Fox Corporation, Disney will phase out the Fox brand by 2024; the brand will continue to be leased as part of the transitional phase. As of 2022, areas that have been affected by the discontinuation of the Fox brand have included Latin America and Brazil; these networks have since been relaunched under the Star (stylized as ST★R) branding.

Current channels

Asia
 Fox Japan

Balkans & Serbia
 Fox is a Serbian television channel launched on October 15, 2012. Previously under the name Fox Televizija, it launched on December 31, 2006, and broadcasts all programs before being acquired by Greece's Antenna Group and became Prva Srpska Televizija on September 20, 2010.

Baltics and CIS
 Fox (previously Fox Crime) was a Russian television channel launched on March 5, 2008. The channel was closed on October 1, 2022, for Russia & Belarus, but it's still active in the CIS & Baltic regions. Cable operators in Latvia and Estonia have localized versions of the channel with advertising and year restrictions.

Belgium
 Fox is a Flemish channel launched on October 1, 2015.

Bulgaria
 Fox is a Bulgarian channel launched on October 15, 2012.

Middle East and North Africa
 Fox Arabia is a Middle Eastern and North African channel launched on March 1, 2011.

Netherlands
 Fox, a Dutch channel owned by Eredivisie Media & Marketing, which is owned 51% by The Walt Disney Company.

Poland
 Fox is a Polish channel launched on November 6, 2010.

Portugal
 Fox is a Portuguese channel launched in 2003.

Spain
 Fox is a Spanish channel launched on June 30, 2002. The channel will be rebranded as Star Channel sometime in 2023.

Turkey

 Fox (previously TGRT) is a Turkish channel launched on February 24 2007.

Former channels

Asia
 Fox Asia, the channel closed in Southeast Asia and Hong Kong on October 1, 2021, and Taiwan on January 1, 2022, with most of its content shifting to the Star content hub on Disney+ (for Singapore, Philippines, Hong Kong and Taiwan) and Disney+ Hotstar (for Southeast Asia region outside Singapore and Philippines).
Fox Thailand
Fox Philippines
Fox Taiwan, the channel, was renamed as the second incarnation of the Taiwan feed of Star World on January 1, 2022.

Denmark
 Xee was a Danish TV channel and video-on-demand service co-owned by Fox Networks Group and YouSee which aired a mixture of typical international Fox programming and domestic Danish programs, in addition to broadcasting association football matches from the Premier League. The channel used the international Fox branding and was launched on January 20, 2019. Fox Networks Group ceased to operate the channel on December 30, 2021, with ownership of the channel transferred to Viaplay Group (then known as NENT Group) on that date; the latter company rebranded the channel and renamed it to See. Much of the Fox programming that used to air on Xee has since been migrated to the Star content hub on Disney+ in Denmark.

Finland
 Fox (formerly SuomiTV) is a Finnish channel launched in 2009. The channel rebranded to Star Channel on January 6, 2023.

Germany, Austria and Switzerland
 Fox was a German channel launched on May 20, 2008. The channel closed on September 30, 2021, with most of its content shifting to the Star content hub on Disney+.

Greece
 Fox was a Greek channel launched on October 1, 2012. It was closed in March 15, 2023, being replaced by the second iteration of FX Greece.

Hungary
 Fox was a Hungarian basic cable TV channel launched on February 4, 2014. The channel was shut down on April 30, 2018, to focus on its streaming service, Fox+, which would be eventually replaced by Disney+.

Italy
 Fox was an Italian channel launched on July 31, 2003, and closed on July 1, 2022.

Latin America
 Fox Channel was a Latin American channel launched on August 14, 1993. It was relaunched as Star Channel on February 22, 2021.

Norway
 Fox was a Norwegian channel launched on July 1, 2013. The channel closed on March 31, 2021, with most of its content shifting to Disney+.

South Africa
 Fox (formerly "'Fox Entertainment") was a South African channel launched on May 1, 2010, and closed on October 1, 2021. Most of its content would move to Disney+, which was launched in South Africa on May 18, 2022.

UK and Ireland

 Fox (previously FX289 and FX) was a British and Irish channel launched on January 12, 2004. The channel closed on July 1, 2021, with most of its content moving to the Star content hub on Disney+.

See also
FX (international) channels
Fox Sports International
Fox Life
Fox Crime

References

International
Fox Networks Group
Disney television networks